The list of Big Ten national championships includes championships won by teams from the Big Ten Conference and former member Chicago.  Including football champions listed in the official NCAA Records book, Big Ten teams have compiled 299 NCAA and Football Bowl Subdivision national championships (as of March 21, 2022) during their years of membership. Prior to NCAA sponsorship of women's sports, Big Ten teams, as members of the AIAW, also won 6 undisputed national championships in 1976–82. In the 2021–22 academic year, Big Ten members have so far won four titles: (1) Northwestern won the NCAA field hockey championship. It is the first for Northwestern in field hockey and the first for the Big Ten since 2001 when Michigan won the title; (2) Wisconsin won the NCAA women's volleyball championship marking the first title for the Badgers in the sport. Wisconsin becomes the third Big Ten school to win in women's volleyball, joining Penn State and Nebraska. It also is the first for the conference since Nebraska won the title in 2017; (3) Penn State won the wrestling championship continuing the Big Ten's championship streak since 2007. Penn State has won nine of the last eleven wrestling titles and tenth overall and (4) Ohio State won the NCAA women's ice hockey championship for the first time in the school's history and only the second NCAA women's sport where the Buckeyes have won a title, joining women's rowing. The title continues the streak of a Big Ten team winning the women's ice hockey title as Wisconsin won the prior two championships.

Listed below are all championship teams of NCAA-sponsored events, as well as the titles won in football, which has a Division I championship not sanctioned by the NCAA. The main list in Sections 2, 3 and 4 includes championships won by Chicago when it was a member, but does not credit a Big Ten NCAA championship to current Big Ten member schools before they joined the conference. These prior titles are separately indicated.
 Michigan State joined in 1950 and competed in the conference for the first time in 1953.
 Penn State joined in 1990 and competed in the conference for the first time in 1991.
 Nebraska joined in 2011.
 Rutgers and Maryland joined in 2014. Johns Hopkins joined in 2014 for men's lacrosse and began play in spring 2015.

Teams

† includes football national championships by Big Ten members starting in 1901, as listed in the official NCAA Football Bowl Subdivision Records book

Most recent NCAA championship

* most recent NCAA championship won by a member of the conference

Fall NCAA sports

Men's cross country (12)

Prior to joining the Big Ten, Michigan State won four and Penn State won three NCAA titles in men's cross country. (7 NCAA before Big Ten)

† Co-champion with Penn State

Women's cross country (3)

Field hockey (3)

Prior to joining the Big Ten, Maryland won 8 NCAA titles and Penn State won 2 AIAW national titles in Field Hockey. (8 NCAA before Big Ten)

Football (41)

The Division I (FBS) football championship is not officially sanctioned by the NCAA; however, the Big Ten teams among the champions and co-champions listed in its official NCAA Football Bowl Subdivision Records book are shown below. Prior to joining the Big Ten, Nebraska won 3 football national titles and 2 co-titles, Penn State won 2 national titles, Maryland won one national title, and Michigan State won one championship (1952, the year before it began Big Ten competition).  The NCAA was formed in 1906 to address violent injuries in the sport.

† As listed in official NCAA Football Bowl Subdivision Records.  For 1950 to present, includes only recognized consensus selections (AP, UP-UPI-USAT, FWAA, NFF)

Men's soccer (12)

Prior to joining the Big Ten, Maryland won 3 NCAA titles in Men's Soccer, and Penn State won 6 national titles awarded by the ISFA in the era before NCAA championships. (3 NCAA before Big Ten)

† Co-champion with Saint Louis (game called because of weather)

‡ Co-champion with Maryland (game ended in tie)

Women's soccer (1)

Women's volleyball (10)

Prior to joining the Big Ten, Nebraska won 3 NCAA titles in women's volleyball. (3 NCAA before Big Ten)

Winter NCAA sports

Men's basketball (10)
Prior to joining the Big Ten, Maryland won 1 NCAA title in men's basketball (2002). (1 NCAA before Big Ten)

The NCAA championship tournament began in 1939.

† Selected by Helms Athletic Foundation, formed in 1936, who compiled a retroactive list of college basketball champions in 1942 for the previous 41 years.  In 12 of those years, a Big Ten team was selected: 1902, 1907–09, 1912, 1914–16, 1919, 1931–32, 1941.  Chicago's 1908 national title was won in a championship series against the University of Pennsylvania.

Women's basketball (1)

Prior to joining the Big Ten, Rutgers won 1 AIAW championship (1982), and Maryland won 1 NCAA title in women's basketball (2006). (1 NCAA before Big Ten)

Men's gymnastics (25)

Prior to joining the Big Ten, Penn State won 9 NCAA titles in men's gymnastics, and Nebraska won 8 NCAA titles. (17 NCAA before Big Ten)

Trampoline (2)

Until 1969, trampoline was one of the events that comprised the NCAA men's gymnastics championships. At that time, the event was removed in order to conform to the international gymnastics itinerary. The NCAA continued to bestow a national title in trampoline for two years.

Women's gymnastics (1)

Prior to joining the Big Ten, and prior to the NCAA sponsored championship, Penn State won 2 AIAW national championships.

Men's ice hockey (23)

Men's ice hockey became an official Big Ten sport in the 2013–14 season.

Men's swimming and diving (29)

† From inception in 1924 through 1936, NCAA team swimming championships were unofficial because team points were not officially awarded.  Team champions were nevertheless proclaimed in the newspapers of the time.

Men's indoor track & field (1)

Women's indoor track & field (0)

Prior to joining the Big Ten, Nebraska in 1982–1984 won 1 AIAW and 2 NCAA indoor women's track and field titles. (2 NCAA before Big Ten)

Men's wrestling (39)

Prior to joining the Big Ten, Penn State won one NCAA title in men's wrestling. (1 NCAA before Big Ten)

† In 1928 and from 1931 to 1933, an NCAA team championship was not awarded because team scoring was unofficial.

Spring NCAA sports

Baseball (6)

Men's golf (4)

Prior to the NCAA sponsored championship, Michigan won 2 national titles.

° NIGA  national champion

Women's golf (1)

Men's lacrosse (1)

Men's lacrosse became an official Big Ten sport in the 2015 season.

Prior to joining the Big Ten as a men's lacrosse affiliate, Johns Hopkins won 35 national titles in the era before the NCAA organized men's lacrosse championships, plus nine NCAA titles. Maryland has nine pre-NCAA national titles and two NCAA titles. (11 NCAA before Big Ten)

The NCAA did not organize national championships in men's lacrosse until the 1971 season. Before that time, other bodies awarded national titles based on regular season records, most notably the United States Intercollegiate Lacrosse Association. Rutgers shared two national titles, in 1928 and 1955 (a Division II co-championship).

Women's lacrosse (10)

Women's lacrosse became an official Big Ten sport in the 2015 season.

Prior to joining the Big Ten, Maryland won 11 NCAA titles and Penn State won 2 NCAA titles in women's lacrosse. (13 NCAA before Big Ten)

Prior to the NCAA sponsored championship, Penn State won 3 national titles and Maryland won 1 AIAW national title.

Women's rowing (3)

Prior to the NCAA sponsored championship, Wisconsin won 5 national titles.

† NWRA College Eights Champion

Softball (1)

Prior to the NCAA sponsored championship, Michigan State won 1 national title.

† AIAW National Champion

Men's tennis (2)

Women's tennis (0)

At the same time that the first NCAA Division I women's tennis championship was held (attracting the top-ranked teams), the AIAW conducted its last tennis championship, which was won by Indiana.

† AIAW National Champion

Men's outdoor track & field (9)

† From 1925 through 1927, the NCAA team championship was unofficial because team points were not officially scored.

National championships in sports not sponsored by the Big Ten
In addition to the national championship titles won in Big Ten sponsored sports, some Big Ten schools participate in official varsity sports not offered by the NCAA (e.g., men's rowing, synchronized swimming) as well as other NCAA sports for which no Big Ten championship is contested. These include bowling, fencing, women's ice hockey, rifle, men's volleyball, and men's and women's water polo, as well as men's ice hockey before the 2013–14 school year plus men's and women's lacrosse before the 2014–15 school year. The following are Big Ten teams' national championships won in other sports (number in parentheses indicates NCAA titles won by Big Ten schools during their years of membership):

Boxing (10)

Penn State won 1 NCAA title in boxing before the NCAA discontinued the sport. (1 NCAA before Big Ten)

† Before 1948, NCAA team boxing championships were unofficial because team points were not officially awarded. However, national publications at the time proclaimed the annual team champions, and the NCAA Record Books still count them as titles won for that year.

Women's bowling (3)

Prior to beginning athletic competition in the Big Ten, Nebraska won 5 WIBC/USBC titles, Penn State won 1 WIBC/USBC title, and Nebraska won 3 NCAA titles in bowling. (3 NCAA before Big Ten)

Co-ed fencing (14)

Prior to beginning athletic competition in the Big Ten, Penn State won 2 NCAA titles in co-ed fencing. (2 NCAA before Big Ten)

Men's fencing (4)

Prior to joining the Big Ten, Rutgers won 1 NCAA co-championship in men's fencing. (1 NCAA before Big Ten)

§ Prior to 1947, the Intercollegiate Fencing Association championship, held since 1894, was premiere.  NYU won the 3-weapon title both of these years.

Women's fencing (0)

Prior to joining the Big Ten, Penn State won 1 NCAA title in women's fencing. (1 NCAA before Big Ten)

Prior to the NCAA sponsored championship, Penn State won 2 AIAW national championships.

Women's ice hockey (12)

Prior to the NCAA sponsored championship, Minnesota won 1 national title.

† AWCHA National Champion (prior to NCAA sponsored championships)

Rifle (0)

Big Ten teams have not won an NCAA rifle championship since inception in 1980.

† NRA National Champion (prior to NCAA sponsored championships). Prior to joining the Big Ten, Maryland won 5 NRA national championships (4 men, 1 women), and Michigan State won 3 (men).

Men's rowing (0)
The NCAA has never offered a men's rowing championship.

† Intercollegiate Rowing Association Varsity Eights Champion

Synchronized swimming (0)

The NCAA has never offered a synchronized swimming championship. However, the AIAW (women's predecessor to the NCAA) did.

† AIAW national champion

From 1983 through 2004, Ohio State won 19 of the 22 national championships sponsored by United States Synchronized Swimming. Ohio State also won championships from 2009 through 2012, and in 2015, 2017, 2018 and 2019.

Men's volleyball (5)

See also
List of NCAA schools with the most NCAA Division I championships
List of NCAA schools with the most Division I national championships
AIAW national championships
List of NCAA schools with the most AIAW Division I national championships

References

Big Ten Conference
Big Ten